Los misterios de Laura is a prime-time Spanish police procedural comedy-drama television series that was broadcast on La 1 of Televisión Española from 2009 to 2014 and a movie broadcast in 2022. It stars María Pujalte as Laura Lebrel, a police detective with a disorganized personal and professional life, and a casual and pleasant personality, but with a great nose and intuition for solving intriguing cases. The series mixes elements of TV series like Murder, She Wrote or Columbo, and at the same time it recovers elements of the mystery novels by Agatha Christie.

The series, that was initially going to be named Madres y detectives, premiered on July 27, 2009 with huge success, surpassing the rival of the night CSI: Crime Scene Investigation.

It has been adapted in Italy as  starring Carlotta Natoli, the Netherlands as  starring  and Russia as Mama-detektiv starring Inga Strelkova-Oboldina. On May 8, 2014 American network NBC announced an American adaptation, titled The Mysteries of Laura and starring Debra Messing.

Cast and characters

Laura Lebrel del Bosque (María Pujalte) is the main character. Her personal and professional life is disorganized, but she manages to combine her role as the mother of twins and as police detective perfectly, always using intuition as a means of connection between her lives. What is surprising is that she does not give importance to material or physical evidence, however, she does give importance to a faded shade, coffee stains on the table, the degrees marking the air conditioning thermostat... she always ends up solving the case at the end of the show with a Sherlock Holmes style, surprising the rest of the characters and the audience.

Jacobo Salgado Sexto (Fernando Guillén Cuervo) is the Chief Inspector of the police station where Laura works since the departure of Gerardo, he's also Laura's ex-husband. He is honest and straightforward. He doesn't participate in the investigations of Laura and Martin, he does his work from his office. The relationship with Laura and Martin is not entirely cordial, and "office life" is not at all easy.

Martín Maresca Delfino is a police detective and Laura's partner and sidekick at work. Restless and impulsive, he is the opposite of Laura. After several years working together, they have come to be blended to perfection. Something he shares with Laura is that he doesn't give importance to material or physical evidence. The twins of Laura call him "Uncle Martin." Although no one else knows, he is "DW", the writer of the blog about "The mysteries of Laura", a tangible proof of his affection and admiration for Laura and perhaps something more. He is somewhat promiscuous and flirts with almost all women, something that brings him some problems.

Vicente Cuevas (César Camino) is a rookie police officer with a lot of nerves and insecurity. The agent Cuevas took over four years to pass the exams to be into the Police Force. His youth, lack of character and lack of experience make him an easy target for criminals who is supposed to stop. His lack of nerve as a field agent is compensated with a great effort to learn and to always follow the orders of his superiors. He is also very good at working with computers, work performed at the police station. His affable and cheerful personality makes him a dear friend of Laura. He wins the heart of Lydia and even asks her to marry him.

Lydia Martínez Fernández (Laura Pamplona) is a police detective working at the station. Her way of working hardly fits with Laura, Lydia's working method is systematic, analytical and scientific. She works in the police laboratory. Lydia doesn't consider Laura as a real police detective and clashes with her are obvious. Her relationships with other co-workers is not much better. She has a past life: she changed her name to not be found by her husband. She had a past relationship with Jacobo. Later, Cuevas managed to break the hard shell covering her heart.

Maribel del Bosque (Beatriz Carvajal) is Laura's mother. After passing through a bad time, Maribel decides to move with her daughter. She loves her grandchildren, but due to their restless nature she did not hold them for long. Instead of removing work from Laura, she seems to give her more. She doesn't like the profession of her daughter, but unwittingly and thoughtlessly she always gives her clues for her police cases when they are discussing them off the record. She has the same casual and pleasant personality of her daughter.

Javier Salgado Lebrel (Raúl del Pozo) is son of Laura and Jacobo, twin brother of Carlos. He's very naughty and makes thousands of pranks with Carlos, even at school.

Carlos Sagrado Lebrel (Juan del Pozo) is son of Laura and Jacobo, twin brother of Javier. He's very naughty and makes thousands of pranks with Javier, even at school.

Episodes

Season 1 (2009)

Season 2 (2011)

Season 3 (2014)

TV movie (2022)

References

External links

La 1 (Spanish TV channel) network series
2009 Spanish television series debuts
2014 Spanish television series endings
2000s police procedural television series
Spanish mystery television series
2000s Spanish comedy television series
2010s Spanish comedy television series
2000s Spanish drama television series
2010s Spanish drama television series
Spanish comedy-drama television series
2000s comedy-drama television series
2010s comedy-drama television series
2010s police procedural television series
Spanish police procedural television series
Television series by Boomerang TV